Phoenicocoris modestus is a species of plant bugs belonging to the family Miridae, subfamily Phylinae that is absent in countries such as Albania, Andorra, Azores, Britain I., Canary Islands, Cyprus,  Denmark, Faroe Islands, Greece, Iceland, Ireland, Latvia, Liechtenstein and all states of former Yugoslavia (except for Bosnia and Herzegovina).

References

Insects described in 1843
Hemiptera of Europe
Miridae